Beisheng Town is a town under the administration of Liuyang, Hunan, China.  it had a population of 58,400 and an area of . It borders Shashi Town in the north, Yong'an Town in the west, Jiaoxi Township and Chunkou Town in the east, and Dongyang Town in the south.

Administrative divisions
The town is divided into 13 villages and two communities: Beishengcang Community, Wulong Community, Mazhan Village, Bajiao Village, Bianzhou Village, Boyang Village, Zhakou Village, Yanwuzhou Village, Lianfang Village, Yaojin Village, Huanyuan Village, Baitang Village, Yazhouhu Village, Bamao Village, and Zhuoran Village.

Education
Public junior high school in the town includes Beisheng Meddle School. There is one senior high school located with the town limits: Liuyang No. 6 High School.

Transportation
 Expressway: Liuyang-Liling Expressway

Attractions
 The Former Residence of Wang Zhen is a scenic spot in the town.

Notable persons
 Li Xiang (born 1967), an electronic information expert, major general, and member of the Chinese Academy of Sciences.
 Wang Zhen (general) (1908–1993), one of the Eight Elders of the Communist Party of China.

References 

2000 Census information from

External links

Divisions of Liuyang
Liuyang